Flatbrookville is an unincorporated community located along Old Mine Road within Walpack Township, in Sussex County, New Jersey, United States. It is named after the Flat Brook, a tributary of the Delaware River, which flows through the community. The area is now part of the Delaware Water Gap National Recreation Area.

History
The Decker Ferry House, built , and the Rosenkrans Ferry House, also known as the Smith-Rosenkrans House, built , provided ferry service across the Delaware River at the Walpack Bend. Both are contributing properties of the Old Mine Road Historic District.

References

External links
 
 
 

Walpack Township, New Jersey
Unincorporated communities in Sussex County, New Jersey
Unincorporated communities in New Jersey
Delaware Water Gap National Recreation Area